Pontibacter odishensis  is a bacterium from the genus of Pontibacter. which has been isolated from soil from a solar saltern.

References

External links
Type strain of Pontibacter odishensis at BacDive -  the Bacterial Diversity Metadatabase

Cytophagia
Bacteria described in 2013